Michael G. Ploog (born July 13, 1940 or 1942) is an American storyboard and comic book artist, and a visual designer for films.

In comics, Ploog is best known for his work on Marvel Comics' 1970s Man-Thing and The Monster of Frankenstein series, and as the initial artist on the features Ghost Rider and Werewolf by Night. His style at the time was heavily influenced by the art of Will Eisner, under whom he apprenticed.

Biography

Early life and career

Born in Mankato, Minnesota, Mike Ploog was one of a family of three brothers and a sister raised, initially, on a Minnesota farm. He began drawing while a young child whose imagination was fired by such old-time radio dramas as Sergeant Preston of the Yukon and Gunsmoke, and such thriller anthologies as Inner Sanctum Mysteries and Tales of Horror. After his parents divorced and sold the farm when Ploog was about 10 or 11 years old, his mother took the children to live with her in Burbank, California. Ploog entered the U.S. Marine Corps, leaving in 1968, after 10 years. Toward the end of his hitch, he began working on the Corps' Leatherneck Magazine, doing bits of writing, photography and art.

Around 1969 he began working on Batman and Superman animated TV-series at the Los Angeles studio Filmation, doing what he called "cleanup work for other artists." The following season he was promoted to layout work on those' characters' series. "Layout," Ploog recalled in a 1998 interview, "is what happens between storyboarding and actual animation; you're literally composing the scenes. You're more or less designing the background, putting the characters into it so they'll look like they're actually walking on the surface". Moving to the Hanna-Barbera studio the following season, he worked on layouts for the animated series Motormouse and Autocat and Wacky Races, as well as "the first Scooby-Doo pilot; nothing spectacular, though. It was okay; it was a salary, y'know? ... I had very few aspirations, because I didn't know where anything I was doing was going to take me".

A Hanna-Barbera colleague passed along a flyer he had gotten from writer-artist Will Eisner seeking an assistant on the military instructional publication PS, The Preventive Maintenance Monthly. Ploog was familiar with it from his Marine Corps days, and knew well the art, though not the artist's name. "I'd been copying his work for years", Ploog said, "because I was doing visual aids and training aids for the military for a long time".

Eisner in 1978 recalled that, "Mike came in working for me in 1967 [sic; Ploog was still in the Marines that year]. I was looking for someone who could work on the PS  magazine ... and Mike sent me his material, or somebody sent it to me, I don't remember which, and I found myself in California, talking Mike into coming to work for us.... We had a very happy relationship for maybe two or three years, four years."

Ploog moved to New York City and remained with Eisner for just over two years. As Ploog recalled:

Marvel Comics and Ghost Rider
Eventually, at the suggestion of Eisner letterer Ben Oda, Ploog broke into comics at Warren Publishing, doing stories for the company's black-and-white horror-comics magazines. A Western sample he showed Marvel got him a callback to draw Werewolf by Night, which premiered in Marvel Spotlight #2 (Feb. 1972). As Ploog recalled,

After three stories in Marvel Spotlight, the feature spun off onto its own book. Ploog then helped launched the initial, Johnny Blaze version of the supernatural motorcyclist Ghost Rider, in Marvel Spotlight #5 (Aug. 1972), and drew the next three adventures.

The specifics of the character's creation are disputed. Roy Thomas, a Marvel writer and the editor-in-chief at the time, recalls, 

Friedrich has responded that,

Ploog recalled, in a 2008 interview:

Ploog and writer Gary Friedrich collaborated on the first six issues of Marvel's The Monster of Frankenstein (Jan.-Oct. 1973), the initial four of which contained a more faithful adaptation of Mary Shelley's novel than has mostly appeared elsewhere; comics historian Don Markstein said, "It was faithful to the story even to the point of leaving the monster trapped in the ice at the end — so of course, the fifth issue began with him being rescued." In a 1989 interview, Ploog said, "I really enjoyed doing Frankenstein because I related to that naive monster wandering around a world he had no knowledge of — an outsider seeing everything through the eyes of a child." The following year, Ploog teamed with  writer Steve Gerber on Man-Thing #5-11 (May-Nov. 1974), penciling a critically acclaimed series of stories involving a dead clown, psychic paralysis in the face of modern society, and other topics far removed from the usual fare of comics of the time, with Ploog's cute-but-creepy art style setting off Gerber's trademark intellectual surrealism.

Ploog's other regular titles at Marvel were Planet of the Apes, Kull the Destroyer and the series Werewolf by Night. Ploog also drew the Don McGregor story "The Reality Manipulators" in the black-and-white comics magazine Marvel Preview #8 (Fall 1976), and the Doug Moench feature "Weirdworld" in the color comic Marvel Premiere #38 (Oct. 1977), among other items.

He left Marvel following what he describes as "a disagreement with Jim Shooter. I had moved to a farm in Minnesota, and agreed to do a hand-colored 'Weirdworld' story. Marvel backed out of the deal after I had started. I can't remember the details, but it doesn't matter. I think I was ready to move on." Marvel and I were both changing. I finished off a black-and-white Kull book that was my last comic for many years." Richard Marschall, editor of what was to be a 60-page "Weirdworld" by Ploog and writer Moench for one of the Marvel Super Special series of one-shots, said at the time that Ploog had been given four months to complete the art, and when it became evident the deadline would not be met, arranged to publish the story in two 30-page installments, giving Ploog two more months. Ploog sent Marvel photocopies of the first 31 pages, and was paid for them. During this time, Marvel had given work-for-hire contracts to its freelancers, many of whom, including Ploog, Frank Brunner, Jack Kirby, Don McGregor, Roger Slifer, and Roger Stern, refused to sign, resulting in cessation of work for Marvel. Ploog "took himself off the project," said Marschall, and retained his original artwork. Moench's script was eventually published as a 106-page story illustrated by penciler John Buscema, inker Rudy Nebres, and airbrush colorist Peter Ledger as the three-part "Warriors of the Shadow Realm" in Marvel Super Special #11-13 (Spring - Fall 1979).

Marginalia includes some work for Heavy Metal magazine in 1981, and three "Luke Malone, Manhunter" backup features in the Atlas/Seaboard title Police Action #1-3 (Feb., April, June 1975), the first of which he also scripted.

Later career
Ploog returned to the movie industry. By his account, he has worked in post-production on the movie Ghostbusters ("All that stuff you saw on cereal boxes are my paintings") and with film director Ralph Bakshi on the animated features Wizards, The Lord of the Rings, and Hey Good Lookin'. He was production designer on Michael Jackson: Moonwalker (1988), and has storyboarded or done other design work on films including John Carpenter's The Thing, Superman II, Little Shop of Horrors and The Unbearable Lightness of Being, and, he says, several Jim Henson Company projects, such as the films The Dark Crystal and Labyrinth and the TV series The Storyteller.

Between movies, Ploog illustrated L. Frank Baum's the Life and Adventures of Santa Claus (1992), a graphic novel adapting The Wonderful Wizard of Oz creator's 1902 novella.

With old colleague Steve Gerber, Ploog drew the Malibu Comics Ultraverse one-shot Sludge: Red X-Mas (Dec. 1994), but otherwise remained away from comics for another decade before teaming with veteran writer J.M. DeMatteis on the CrossGen fantasy Abadazad (May 2004).

Ploog has illustrated cards for the Magic: The Gathering collectible card game.

Bibliography

Comics and magazines

Warren Publishing
Creepy #44 ("Sleep") (1972)
Eerie #35 ("The Tower of the Demon Dooms"); #40 ("The Brain of Frankenstein") (1971-72)
Vampirella #14 ("The Wedding Gift") (1971)

Marvel Comics
Amazing Adventures #12 (inker) (The Beast) (1972)
Conan The Barbarian #57 (1975)
Crazy Magazine #1 ("Kung Fooey"); 4 ("Shafted"); #7 ("The Tattletale Heart") (1973-74)
Dracula Lives #4 ("Fear Stalker") (1974)
Frankenstein #1-6 (1973)
Kull The Destroyer #11-15 (1973-74)
Man-Thing #5-11; Giant-Size Man-Thing #1 (1974)
Marvel Fanfare #24 (Weirdworld) (1984)
Marvel Premiere #38 (Weirdworld) (1977)
Marvel Preview #8 ("The Reality Manipulators") (1976)
Marvel Spotlight #2–4 (Werewolf by Night); #5-8 (Ghost Rider) (1972-73)
Marvel Super Action #1 ("An Ugly Mirror on Weirdworld") (1976)
Planet of the Apes #1-4, #6-8, #11, #13-14, #19 (1974-76)
Savage Sword of Conan #34 ("Mirrors of Tuzun Thune") (Kull) (1978)
Werewolf by Night #1-7, #13-16 (1972-74)

Big Apple Productions
Big Apple Comix ("The Silent Minority") (1975)

Pacific Comics
Twisted Tales #2 ("Over His Head") (1983)

First Comics
Classics Illustrated #9 - The Adventures of Tom Sawyer (1990)

Tundra Publishing
L. Frank Baum's The Life and Adventures of Santa Claus (1992)

Malibu Comics
Sludge Red X-Mas #1 (1994)

CrossGen Comics
Abadazad (2004)

Image Comics
The Stardust Kid #1-3 (2005)

Boom! Studios
The Stardust Kid #4-5 (2006-07)

Dark Horse Comics
The Goon Noir #1 ("When Franky Fell from Favor") (2006)

Full Circle Publications
Thicker Than Blood #1-3 (with Simon Bisley) (2007-08)

DC Comics
The Spirit (2007 series) #14, #31-32 (2008-09)
The Spirit (2010 series) #9 ("The Christmas Spirit") (2011)

References

External links
 Mike Ploog at the Unofficial Handbook of Marvel Comics Creators

Interviews
 J.M. DeMatteis: Fantasy Life, Comics Bulletin, January 14, 2004
 Dematteis & Ploog Together Again by Benjamin Ong Pang Kean, Newsarama, December 3, 2004
 Mike Ploog interview, page 1 and page 2, Alter Ego #62 (Oct. 2006), reprinted at Newsarama. October 7, 2006

1940s births
American comics artists
American illustrators
American production designers
American speculative fiction artists
American storyboard artists
Fantasy artists
Game artists
Inkpot Award winners
Living people
Marvel Comics people
People from Mankato, Minnesota
Science fiction artists
Year of birth uncertain